The Rural Municipality of Milton No. 292 is a rural municipality (RM) in the Canadian province of Saskatchewan within Census Division No. 13 and  Division No. 6. Located in the west-central portion of the province, it is adjacent to the Alberta boundary.

History 
The RM of Milton No. 292 incorporated as a rural municipality on December 11, 1911. It was previously established as the Wirral Improvement District in 1905.

Geography

Communities and localities 
The following urban municipalities are surrounded by the RM.

Villages
 Marengo

The following unincorporated communities are within the RM.

Special service areas
 Alsask

Localities
 Merid

Demographics 

Government 
The RM of Milton No. 292 is governed by an elected municipal council and an appointed administrator that meets on the second Wednesday of every month. The reeve of the RM is David Bond while its administrator is Robin Busby. The RM's office is located in Marengo.

Transportation 
Rail
C.N.R. Saskatoon Calgary Branch—serves Flaxcombe, Marengo, Merid, Alsask, Sibbald
Mantario Subdivision C.N.R—serves Kindersley, Alsask, Ardene

Roads
Highway 7—serves Alsask
Highway 44—serves Alsask
Highway 317
Francena Minerals Road, Saskatchewan
Merid Road, Saskatchewan—comes close to Merid

References 

M

Division No. 13, Saskatchewan